Edgar Alejandro Cortez Espinoza (born August 10, 1989, in Santa Teresa, Carazo, Nicaragua) is a Nicaraguan middle distance runner who specializes in the 800 metres. His personal best in the event is 1:49.10 achieved in 2011 in Daegu which is the current Nicaraguan record.

He competed at the 2012 Summer Olympics, in London, England.  He was 7th in his round 1 heat with a time of 1:58.99.

Personal bests
400 m: 49.85 s  –  Ciudad de Panamá, 18 April 2010
800 m: 1:49.10 min  –  Daegu, 27 August 2011

Competition record

References

External links
 

1989 births
Living people
Nicaraguan male middle-distance runners
People from Carazo Department
Athletes (track and field) at the 2011 Pan American Games
Athletes (track and field) at the 2012 Summer Olympics
Olympic athletes of Nicaragua
Pan American Games competitors for Nicaragua
World Athletics Championships athletes for Nicaragua
Central American Games gold medalists for Nicaragua
Central American Games medalists in athletics
Central American Games bronze medalists for Nicaragua